Swamp Man is the fifth and final studio album by Japanese rock band High and Mighty Color. It was the first album to features new vocalist Halca. The album was released in Japan on September 2, 2009 with no physical singles released.

Overview 
Swamp Man is the first album to feature Halca as a vocalist after the departure of Mākii. It is also the band's last, as they disbanded almost a year later. Two digital singles were released prior to the release of the album: "XYZ" and "Good Bye" on iTunes in both Japan and the US. A PV for "Good Bye" was released on the band's official YouTube page on August 9, 2009. The album features a heavier sound compared to the band's previous albums.

The album debuted at #25 on the Oricon Charts.

Track listing

Personnel
 Halca – vocals
 Yuusuke – vocals
 Meg – guitars
 Kazuto – guitars
 Sassy – drums
 Mackaz – bass

Charts

Album - Oricon Sales Chart (Japan)

References

High and Mighty Color albums
2009 albums